The Badr-1 210 mm is a Yemeni military, self-propelled, multiple rocket launcher; a type of rocket artillery, used by Houthis. It features a twin tube launcher mounted on a 6×6 truck.

On 25 August 2019, according to Aljazeera, Houthis claimed that they fired as many as 10 Badr-1 rockets at an airport in southwest Saudi Arabia. The Saudi-led coalition forces said that they had intercepted at least 6 rockets targeted at civilian population in Jizan.

See also
 BM-30 Smerch
 KN-09 (MRL)
 Astros II MLRS
 Burkan-2

References

Self-propelled artillery
Salvo weapons
Multiple rocket launchers
Military equipment of Yemen
Guided missiles of Yemen